André Cartier (24 December 1945 – 22 May 2020) was a Canadian actor, known for playing André in the children's series Passe-Partout.

Biography
As a child, Cartier appeared in the musical Les posters, written by Louis-Georges Carrier and Claude Léveillée and presented at the Théâtre du Rideau Vert. He became a published writer in 1997 with the novel Pays-Perdu. He founded the environmental group Vers un Idéal Écologique in 1988 alongside a group of citizens from Contrecœur. The establishment promoted a more environmentally conscious way of life for every citizen.

André Cartier died in Dunham on 22 May 2020 at the age of 74.

Filmography
La Cellule (1959)
Les Oraliens (1969–1970)
Sol et Gobelet (1969–1971)
Quelle famille! (1969–1974)
La Maison des amants (1972)
Clak (1972–1974)
Des armes et les hommes (1973)
Taureau (1973)
Bound for Glory (1975)
Youhou (1975)
Animagerie (1977–1980)
Passe-Partout (1977)
Pop Citrouille (1979–1985)
Peau de banane (1982)
Vaut mieux en rire (1982)
La bonne aventure (1982)
Entre chien et loup (1984–1992)
Un homme (1997)
Futur en direct (2000)

References

Canadian male child actors
Male actors from Quebec
Place of birth missing
1945 births
2020 deaths
French Quebecers
20th-century Canadian male actors